Scania tephra is a moth of the family Noctuidae. It is found in Chile.

External links
 Noctuinae of Chile

Noctuinae
Fauna of Chile
Moths of South America
Insects of South America
Endemic fauna of Chile